Eric Pollard is an American snow freeskier and film editor from Welches, Oregon and currently resides in the Hood River region of Oregon. He was a professional skier for Line Skis for over 22 years and now designs skis and snowboards for Season. Always challenging the status quo, he has innovated outerwear, accessories and hard goods for FW Apparel, Anon Optics, Dakine, K2, Causwell and Hest.

Skiing
Eric Pollard began skiing professionally at the age of fifteen. He learned on Mount Hood, where snowboarders far outnumber skiers and as a result developed a unique style more closely resembling snowboarders. Because of this he developed the first fully symmetrical ski—equal height tip and tail, with a symmetrical flex. Pollard mostly works with filming and skiing backcountry rather than competitions.

Season 
With snowboarder Austin Smith, Eric founded ski and snowboard company Season EQPT for carving, all-mountain, powder and touring. The timeless black products, Kin, Aero, Nexus, Forma and Pass, questions annual consumer culture, supports product longevity and creates unity for everyone in the mountains. The skis are made in at Amer Sports and snowboards are made at SWS-Boards. It is the first ski and snowboard brand to be Climate Neutral Certified.

Nimbus Independent Films
In 2007, Pollard created Nimbus Independent with Pep Fujas, Andy Mahre and Chris Benchetler. Nimbus was an early producer of webisodes. His goal in creating the company was to show skiing as it is, with all the ups and downs. The company produces short films showing highlights of its creators' seasons. Named Powder Magazine's "Movie of the Year" Drawn From Here is a film by Eric Pollard that opens with an exploration of his processes as a skier, as a ski/product designer, and as an artist. It follows the influences he draws from—like basing the shape of a ski tip off of a surfboard or finding patterns observed in nature to integrate into the graphics he hand draws for a ski—and illuminates a thread that runs through and binds all his different disciplines and hobbies.

Personal life
Eric initially intended to go to art school and become a graphic designer, but ended up skiing with his family and loved it. He is married to Erin Valverde Pollard and has two children.

External links
Season 
Nimbus Independent
Eric Pollard Design website

References

Living people
American male freestyle skiers
Freeskiers
Year of birth missing (living people)
Sportspeople from Oregon